Zossed in Space is an action video game written by Jyym Pearson for the TRS-80 and published by Adventure International in 1981.

Gameplay
In Zossed in Space the player collects trading units and elminates enemy ships in many sectors of space.

Reception
John L. Vogel reviewed the game for Computer Gaming World, and stated that "This is the kind of game you can introduce to a visitor with only a couple of minutes instruction, as well as play yourself on a continuing basis. If you find yourself stuffing too many quarters into arcade machines, this is a fairly good alternative."

References

1981 video games
Adventure International games
Shoot 'em ups
TRS-80 games
TRS-80-only games
Video games developed in the United States
Video games set in outer space